The 193 Squadron of the Israeli Air Force (IAF), also known as the Maritime Helicopters Squadron and operates on behalf of the Israeli Navy.

Established in June 1987 as a new squadron flying the Eurocopter HH-65A Dolphin from Palmachim Airbase.

Aircraft

The squadron was initially assigned the Eurocopter HH-65A beginning in 1987, but after the loss of one airframe in 1996 the IAF retired the remaining HH-65A in 1987. Both airframes were test airframes from the United States Coast Guard.

Today the squadron is home to seven AS565 Panther helicopters based at either Ramat David Airbase or Palmachim Airbase. These helicopters are also assigned and can land on the Sa'ar 5-class corvettes.  One Panther helicopter crashed on January 3, 2022 killing two airmen and injuring a naval officer.  In 2015 the IAF ordered eight Sikorsky SH-60 Seahawks (US Navy surplus) to replace the Panthers, with delivery expected in 2024.

References

Israeli Air Force squadrons